The 1942 Amateur World Series was the fifth edition of the Amateur World Series (AWS), an international men's amateur baseball tournament. The tournament was sanctioned by the International Baseball Federation (which titled it the Baseball World Cup as of the 1988 tournament). The tournament took place, for the fourth consecutive time, in Cuba. It was contested by four national teams playing twelve games each from September 26 through October 20 in Havana. Cuba won its third AWS title.

There was a noticeably lower participation of teams as the effects of World War II started to be felt in the Pacific. The United States withdrew and forfeited their last four games. Therefore, the number of games contested, as opposed to slated, was actually 26.

Final standings

Notes
The Cuban squad, managed by León Rojas, beat defending champion Venezuela, avenging a disappointing loss the previous year, with Connie Marrero out pitching Daniel Canónico.
Cuban catcher Andrés Fleitas hit .405 (15-for-37) and was named Most Valuable Player, while pitchers Julio Moreno and Isidoro León won three games apiece and posted sub 2.00 earned run averages. Luis Suárez batted .579 (11-for-19) and Juan Ealo hit .375 and led the series with four doubles.
The Dominican Republic had a strong finish to win the Silver Medal and beat Cuba in 2 of 3 match-ups.
Venezuela failed in their attempt to defend their title. Luis Aparicio, Sr., father of future Hall of Famer Luis Aparicio, played shortstop.
Mexico earned just three wins, finishing in fourth place.
The United States had a 1–7 record before withdrawing and forfeiting its final four contests.

Sources
Bjarkman, Peter C., 2005. Diamonds Around the Globe: The Encyclopedia of International Baseball. Greenwood Publishing Group. 

Amateur World Series, 1942
Baseball World Cup
1942
Amateur World Series
Amateur World Series
Amateur World Series
Baseball competitions in Havana
20th century in Havana